Robert Enoch Withers (September 18, 1821September 21, 1907) was an American physician, military officer, newspaperman, politician diplomat, and Freemason. He fought against the United States in the Civil War.  He served as Lieutenant Governor of Virginia and represented Virginia in the United States Senate and served as U.S. Consul in Hong Kong.

Biography
Withers was born near Lynchburg, Virginia. He attended private schools and then graduated from the medical department of the University of Virginia at Charlottesville in 1841. He commenced practice in Campbell County. In 1858, Withers moved to Danville, Virginia. While studying at university, Withers was inducted into the freemasons, an organization that he would remain with for life, specifically as a leader in the Knights Templar.

During the American Civil War, he entered the Confederate Army in early 1861 as the major of the 18th Virginia Infantry. He was subsequently promoted to colonel of the regiment, which he commanded until retired because of numerous disabling wounds. He was then appointed to command the Confederate military post at Danville, an administrative position he held until the close of the war.

Following the Civil War, Withers moved back to Lynchburg in 1866 and established the Lynchburg News, a daily paper devoted to the interests of the Conservative Party. He was nominated for Governor of Virginia by that party, but withdrew from the race. He was a presidential elector on the Democratic ticket in 1872. He was elected the 11th Lieutenant Governor of Virginia in 1873. He was elected as a Democrat to the United States Senate and served from March 4, 1875, to March 4, 1881. He served as the chairman of the Committee on Pensions in the 46th Congress. Withers was an unsuccessful candidate for reelection in 1881, losing to former Civil War general William Mahone of the Readjuster Party.

He was appointed by President Grover Cleveland as the United States consul at British Hong Kong, from 1885–89, when he resigned. He returned to the United States and retired to Wytheville, Virginia. During his retirement, he comprised his personal autobiography, Memoirs of an Octogenarian. He was a distant relative of figures such as George Washington and Robert E. Lee, as well as a direct descendant of Nicolas Martiau, founder of Yorktown, Virginia.

Withers was a slave owner.

Withers died at the "Ingleside" plantation in Wytheville on September 21, 1907. He was buried in the East End Cemetery.

References

 Retrieved on 2008-10-18

1821 births
1907 deaths
People from Campbell County, Virginia
American people of English descent
Democratic Party United States senators from Virginia
Virginia Democrats
Consuls general of the United States in Hong Kong and Macau
19th-century American diplomats
Lieutenant Governors of Virginia
American Freemasons
Confederate States Army officers
People of Virginia in the American Civil War
19th-century American politicians
Southern Historical Society